Kim Il-sung Stadium is a multi-purpose stadium located in Pyongyang, the capital city of North Korea. The stadium is used primarily for association football matches.

History

Kim Il-sung Stadium was originally named the Girimri Stadium (기림리공설운동장) in 1926. This stadium held the annual Kyung-Pyong Football Match between Kyungsung FC and Pyongyang FC during the 1920s, 1930s and 1940s.

After the division of Korea, it was used as a venue for speeches by politicians. On 14 October 1945, it was the site of Kim Il-sung's victory speech after the liberation of Pyongyang, called "Every Effort for the Building of a New Democratic Korea."

Most of the stadium was destroyed during the 1950-1953 Korean War, mostly by U.S. aerial bombing of the capital city during those years. Rebuilt in 1969, it was then called Moranbong Stadium, but in April 1982 it was renovated and renamed in honour of Kim Il-sung. It is used mainly for football matches, and until the 1990s hosted the mass games  (now held in Rungnado May Day Stadium).

Present day
Today, the Kim Il-sung stadium is used as the home ground for the North Korea national football team, the North Korea women's national football team and the Pyongyang City Sports Club and Kigwancha Sports Club.

In 2008, on two occasions, a 2010 World Cup qualifying match between North and South Korea, due to be played in Pyongyang, had to be moved to Shanghai when authorities in the North refused to allow the South Korean national anthem to be played in Kim Il-sung Stadium, or the flag of South Korea to be flown, as North and South Korea have never granted each other formal diplomatic recognition.

The start and finish of the annual Pyongyang Marathon occurs at Kim Il-sung Stadium.

See also 

 List of football stadiums in North Korea

References

Further reading

External links 

 Kim Il-Sung Stadium photo at WorldStadiums.com
 Kim Il-Sung Stadium on Google Maps

Sports venues completed in 1969
Football venues in North Korea
National stadiums
Sports venues in Pyongyang
Kim Il-sung
1969 establishments in North Korea
20th-century architecture in North Korea